Angela Cockerham is an Independent member of the Mississippi House of Representatives, representing the 96th district. Cockerham joined the Mississippi House appropriations committee in 2013.

According to Cockerham, she doesn't cast votes based on her party affiliation but based upon her beliefs:

In its 2017 rankings of the members of the Mississippi legislature, the American Conservative Union (ACU) found Cockerham to be the most conservative Democrat in the House, with an overall rating of 56 per cent (the average for Democratic representatives that year was 28 per cent).

References

External links
 
Legislative page

Living people
Members of the Mississippi House of Representatives
1976 births
Mississippi Independents
Women state legislators in Mississippi
Politicians from Jackson, Mississippi
Jackson State University alumni
Tufts University alumni
Loyola University New Orleans alumni
People from Magnolia, Mississippi
Lawyers from Jackson, Mississippi
African-American state legislators in Mississippi
21st-century American politicians
21st-century American women politicians
21st-century African-American women
21st-century African-American politicians
Mississippi College School of Law faculty